Peperomia deppeana is a species of plant in the genus Peperomia of the family Piperaceae. Its native range reaches from Mexico to Central America.

References

deppeana
Flora of Mexico